Pribovce is a village in the municipality of Bujanovac, Serbia. According to the 2002 census, the town has a population of 348 people.

References

Populated places in Pčinja District

fr:Pribovce (Bujanovac)
sl:Pribovce, Bujanovac